Echinolaena is a genus of plants in tribe Paspaleae of the grass family, native to the New World tropics. It includes only two species after the referral of former members to the related genera Hildaea, Ichnanthus, Oedochloa and the more distant Chasechloa (tribe Paniceae) in a 2015 revision.

 Species
 Echinolaena gracilis - from Yucatán to Bolivia
 Echinolaena inflexa - Guyana, Suriname, French  Guiana, Venezuela, Colombia, Bolivia, Mato Grosso, Mato Grosso do Sul, Minas Gerais, Bahia, Goiás, D.F., São Paulo, Maranhão

 formerly included

References

 
Grasses of North America
Grasses of South America
Poaceae genera
Taxonomy articles created by Polbot